() was a governor of the Umayyad Caliphate in the early 8th century.

The brother of the powerful governor of Iraq, al-Hajjaj ibn Yusuf, Muhammad served under his brother as deputy governor for Fars. He is credited as the founder of the city of Shiraz, which became the capital of Fars, in 693. He later served as governor for the Yemen. He died in the latter office in 714/5. His daughter Umm al-Hajjaj married caliph Yazid II, and their son, al-Walid II, ruled as the eleventh Umayyad caliph.

References

Sources 
 
 
 
 
 

7th-century births
715 deaths
8th-century Arabs
City founders
Banu Thaqif
Shiraz
Umayyad governors of Yemen
8th century in Yemen